is an anime television series produced by Zuiyo Eizo and is based on the novel Heidi's Years of Wandering and Learning by Johanna Spyri (1880). It was directed by Isao Takahata and features contributions by numerous other anime filmmakers, including Yoichi Kotabe (character design, animation director), Toyoo Ashida (co-character design, animation director), Yoshiyuki Tomino (storyboard, screenplay), and Hayao Miyazaki (scene design, layout, screenplay).

Heidi is the 6th and final entry in Calpis Comic Theater, a precursor of the World Masterpiece Theater series, based on classic tales from the Western world. The animation studio responsible for Heidi, Zuiyo Enterprise, would split in 1975 into Nippon Animation Company, Ltd. (which employed the anime's production staff and continued with the World Masterpiece Theater franchise) and Zuiyo Company, Ltd., which retained the rights (and debt) to the Heidi TV series. The feature-length film edit of the TV series, released in March 1979, was engineered completely by Zuiyo, with no additional involvement from Nippon Animation, Takahata or Miyazaki. Zuiyo also re-edited the series in two OVA released in 1996.

Plot
Heidi is five years old when her aunt Dete, who has raised Heidi since her parents' deaths four years earlier, takes Heidi to live with her formidable grandfather in the Swiss Alps. Dete has found a promising job in Frankfurt, but cannot leave while still Heidi's guardian, nor can she take Heidi with her. The only relative left is Heidi's grandfather, and in Dete's opinion, he should take some responsibility. Alm-Onji, as Heidi's grandfather is commonly known, has a fearsome reputation with the villagers of Dörfli, as rumors claim that in his youth he killed a man. Now he lives a solitary life with his dog Josef in a cabin halfway up the mountain. However, Heidi quickly wins her way into his heart with her enthusiasm and intelligence, firmly establishing herself in his life. She spends her days on the mountain top with the goatherd Peter, whose responsibility it is to take the villagers' goats to the high mountains for pasture, and her winters occasionally visiting Peter's grandmother, a blind old woman whose dream is to one day hear her cherished book of psalms read to her (which Peter cannot do since he failed to learn to read). Alm-Onji's misanthropy and seclusion prevents Heidi from going to school, of which she has no experience anyway, ultimately leaving her illiterate.

Heidi continues to live happily in the mountains until Aunt Dete returns from the city, excited about a good opportunity for Heidi. A wealthy German businessman, Mr. Sesemann, is searching for a companion for his wheelchair-using daughter Clara. Thwarted by Alm-Onji, Dete tricks Heidi into accompanying her, ostensibly to get a present for Peter and her grandfather. Promised that she can return at any time, Heidi is taken to Frankfurt. There, Dete abandons her to the "care" of Miss Rottenmeier, the strict, no-nonsense governess in charge of Clara's welfare. Heidi and Clara quickly become friends, and Heidi quickly turns the household topsy-turvy with her escapades and well-meaning faux pas. Clara is enchanted by Heidi's stories of the Alps, which paint a picture of a life completely different from the sheltered and lonely one she is accustomed to. Her father is mostly away on business, and Clara's only constant companions until now are the servants and her pet canary.

Heidi's longing to return home and occasional attempts to escape are punctuated by the occasional distractions of new friends. She smuggles a small kitten into the house, and she and Clara care for it until Miss Rottenmeier discovers it and has it thrown out, until Sebastian, the kindly butler, is able to leave the kitten with a friend. Clara's doctor befriends her, and occasionally keeps a benevolent eye on her, but it is Clara's grandmother that has the most impact. On one of her rare visits to Frankfurt, she and Heidi become fast friends. Under her kindly tutelage, Heidi finally learns how to read, to the astonishment of the tutor who has struggled for months to do the same. However, the old woman's departure home again proves a turning point for Heidi. Forbidden by Miss Rottenmeier to ever mention or even think of the Alps again, Heidi rapidly goes into a decline, eventually becoming a sleep-walker, whose passage through the hallways is mistaken for that of a ghost, terrorizing the household.

Summoned home to deal with the haunting, Mr. Sesemann, with the aid of the doctor, catch Heidi in the middle of the night. The doctor diagnoses Heidi's condition and persuades Mr. Sesemann to send the girl back to her Alps before she dies of homesickness. Clara is only reconciled by the promise that she will be allowed to visit Heidi in her mountains. Under the care of Sebastian, Heidi embarks on the long trip home, finally returning to her grandfather, Peter and his family.

Heidi's return and her newfound enjoyment of reading prompt Alm-Onji to partially restore a ruined house down in the village, where they retire the following winter so that Heidi can start going to school. Over the course of the season, Heidi and Alm-Onji become friendly with the villagers, and Peter builds his own sled and wins a local race. The subsequent spring, they return to the mountain in the Alps, bidding farewell to their new friends. In Frankfurt, Clara, who has been longing to see her friend again, reminds her father of his promise to her, but he reminds her that the conditions in the Swiss Alps may be too harsh for her to handle. The doctor is sent to the Alps in her place, to inspect the area and determine whether it is an appropriate environment for a disabled, sick young girl. Heidi, Peter, Alm-Onji, and the limitations of the terrain convince the doctor that this may be just the place for Clara to try her legs again.

In due course, Clara comes to the Alps with Miss Rottenmeier, who shows a clear disapproval of the rustic conditions, an open fear of animals, and distress at the potential for accidents on the mountain. However, Clara's grandmother soon arrives, and after seeing first-hand the vast improvement in Clara's condition, sends Miss Rottenmeier home, commending Clara to the Alm-Onji's care before departing herself. After having established that Clara's legs are capable of functioning, the children and Alm-Onji begin to work on Clara's physical therapy. Eventually, Clara is able to walk without assistance and returns home with her father and grandmother, promising that she will return the following spring to be with her friends again.

Cast

Additional English Voices
Vic Perrin (Postman)
Alan Reed (Mr. Usher)
Barney Phillips (Mr. Kaehlin)
Julie McWhirter (Neighbor Lady)

Characters

Main characters

Heidi, christened Adelheid, is 5 years old and an orphan at the time the story begins. The story eventually ends some three years later. Heidi's curiosity, enthusiasm, and intelligence charm most people and animals into friendship, with one notable exception being Ms. Rottenmeier, the housekeeper of the Sesemann family. Heidi's only relatives are her Aunt Dete, from her mother's side, and her paternal grandfather, the Alm-Onji.

The Alm-Onji, or Onji (Alm-Öhi in German), is never identified by any proper name. He is an old man, but still physically formidable, with a deep well of wisdom and mountain knowledge that he uses to survive the harsh conditions of the Swiss Alps. He is rumored to have killed a man in his youth, and is considered unaproachably stern; but he gradually comes out of his shell once Heidi is in his care. He is a skilled woodworker, creating bowls and assorted utensils out of wood, and provides milk for trade with the villagers.

Peter is an 11-year-old goatherd who is responsible for caring for the village goats during the summer. He lives with his mother and his blind grandmother in a shack some distance from the village. His father was a goatherd as well, until he died. Peter's family is not wealthy, and he was used to going hungry until he befriended Heidi. He is an indifferent student, and is somewhat notorious for his appetite and academic incompetence; however, towards the end of the animated series he discovers a natural talent at carpentry.

Clara is the 12-year-old daughter of a wealthy wine merchant who due to professional and personal reasons spends most of his time away from his home in Frankfurt since his wife's death. Because her legs are paralyzed (the exact cause is left unknown, but it is hinted to be due to a long-term illness), Clara has spent a lonely life in her home; therefore the Sesemann housekeeper, Miss Rottenmeier, has publicized a request for a playmate, which Heidi's aunt Dete answered. Despite their age difference, and because they have only each other to turn to, Heidi and Clara become very close, which occasionally makes Peter jealous of Clara, although he still also cares greatly for Clara and goes to great lengths to help her. While in the original story it is Peter who destroys Clara's wheelchair, in the anime series it is Clara who accidentally wrecks it when she begins to have doubts about wanting to walk.

Others
Joseph Heidi's grandfather's dog, a St. Bernard. Mostly lazying around the alm hut, he is nevertheless stout and reliable in an emergency, and has a habit of gobbling up any snail he encounters. This character was created exclusively for the series, and does not appear in Johanna Spyri's original story.
Yuki A kid goat ("Snow"; English name: "Snowflake") among the flock Peter cares for. She had taken an instant liking to Heidi upon first meeting her. Based on a kid goat named "Schneehöppli" from the book.
Brigette Peter's mother.
Peter's Grandmother Peter's grandmother who lives with him and her daughter, Brigette. Blind for several years, her greatest dream is to have someone read her favorite songs from an old book in her possession.
 Aunt Dete is the sister of Heidi's mother, Adelheid. In the novel and the series, she is portrayed as a rather self-centered person, considering her own interests first and neglecting the opinions of others.
 Miss Rottenmeier is the governess and housekeeper of the Sesemann family.
Sebastian The butler of the Sesemann family.
Tinette The maid of the Sesemann family.
Johan The carriage driver for the Sesemann family.
 Mr. Sesemann is Clara's father and the head of the Sesemann household. Absent from his house most of the time, he leaves the daily proceedings to Fräulein Rottenmeier, though he occasionally returns home when pressing concerns are brought to his attention.
 Clara's attending physician and an old friend of the Sesemann household, who also befriends Heidi when she first encounters him on an errand for Herr Sesemann. In the German version of the series, he is usually called "Herr Geheimrat" (in place of his actual "Medizinalrat" title).
Frau Sesemann Clara's grandmother and Mr. Sesemann's mother, who lives in Holstein and visits her son's household only infrequently. A lively and informal person despite her age, full of humor and fun, who strongly contrasts (and silently clashes) with Fräulein Rottenmeier and her strict adherence to discipline.

Production 
In 1967, future Zuiyo founder Shigeto Takahashi, manager of TCJ at the time, produced a 5-minute pilot short for a series based on Johanna Spyri's novel, but the project was shelved until the new studio was founded. The series finally went into production in 1973, when a new pilot with character design by Yasuji Mori was produced as a test. This work however was never shown publicly and what remain of it are only a few cels and concept arts.

For an accurate depiction of the settings, Takahashi asked his staff to make a scout trip to Switzerland, so that they could carefully study the locations for the series. In summer of 1973, Isao Takahata, Hayao Miyazaki and new character designer (and animation director) Yōichi Kotabe made a two-day visit to Maienfeld and later they also traveled to Frankfurt in Germany. The results of their research were used as a reference in the design of the settings and backgrounds, and in the characters designs. The group stayed at the Heidialp hut which served as an inspiration for the grandfather's cottage. Before his trip to Switzerland, Kotabe had drawn Heidi with two pigtails based on Mori's previous design, but he removed them after a Swiss librarian told him that a 5-year-old girl who lives in the mountains wouldn't be able to tie one. For the grandfather's design, Kotabe took inspiration from a wooden carved figure in a local souvenir shop, which he quickly sketched without being noticed by the shopkeeper.

Many new episodic adventures were added to the narration to pad the story, especially in the first part of the series. One of the most notable changes is in the character of Peter, made considerably less hostile, when in the original novel he even breaks Clara's wheelchair out of jealousy.

International broadcast
The Heidi, Girl of the Alps anime has been dubbed into about twenty languages. The TV series was able to reach major stardom in Asia, Europe, Latin America, the Arab world, and South Africa.

Spanish versions
In Spain, the series debuted on TVE in 1975, simply titled Heidi. An introduction to anime for many of the 70's Spanish generation, the show became one of the most popular anime of all time in Spain, enough to have its own Spanish merchandise, including a comic book adaptation-turned-continuation of the series, published bi-weekly by Ediciones Recreativas and consisting of over an hundred issues in total from 1975 to 1981. "Abuelito, dime tú" became one of the best known children's songs in Spain and Heidi herself became one of both Sélica Torcal and Marisa Marco's most famous roles. The name "Rottenmeier" became synonymous with "uptight, straight-laced hag" among Spaniards and has subsequently been used to describe multiple female politicians, and the Spanish parliament, among others in Spain, and has the woman been used as a bad type of 'potential' single (the suggestion coming from her first reference name "Fräulein" meaning "unmarried woman").

The show was also quite popular in Colombia, Venezuela and Peru.

German version

The lyrics for the title song, which was simply titled "Heidi" were written by Andrea Wagner and Wolfgang Weinzierl the last one who also made the script translations and dubbing direction.

The German-language version of the series was first broadcast on ZDF, German national television programm, from September 18, 1977, to September 24, 1978.

Italian version
Heidi, Girl of the Alps was also a huge success in Italy, where it is still one of the best known and loved anime of all time. Its first broadcast was from February 7 to June 6, 1978, and it had very successful yearly re-runs. A good amount of popularity is also enjoyed by the title song of the Italian version, sung by Elisabetta Viviani. The Italian dub was made from the German one, so it features the same soundtrack and dialogue adaptation.

In Italy, also, the series was summed up and reassembled in three feature films, released in cinemas from 1978 through to 1979. The first of the three, Heidi va in città ("Heidi goes to town"), summarizes the episodes in which the protagonist is brought to Frankfurt and befriends Clara, although the longing for her grandfather makes Heidi understand after many vicissitudes that she should go back to live in the mountains. The second, Heidi torna tra i monti ("Heidi goes back to the mountains"), summarizes the latest episodes of the television series. Heidi, finally back with her grandfather, continues to maintain the friendship at a distance with Clara. Who, precisely during a visit to the girl initially hampered by Mrs. Rottenmeier, will resume the use of her legs. The third feature to be released, Heidi a scuola ("Heidi at school"), sums up the first part of the series, which includes the arrival of Heidi in the mountains and the meeting with her grandfather. All three titles were officially distributed in 16mm by Sampaolo Film.

Arabic version
The series was dubbed into Arabic and aired in the Arab world. It had an original Arabic opening theme, which was very different from the original Japanese opening theme.

South African Afrikaans version and English-South African theme single
Dubbed for the South African Broadcasting Corporation (SABC) by Leephy Studios, the show was incredibly popular in South Africa during the late 1970s and early 1980s and had a number of re-runs. While the (German) theme song wasn't initially dubbed into Afrikaans, multiple covers of it in the language exist, including by Carike Keuzenkamp and Kurt Darren, the latter released in 2012 and which makes brand new verses for the song. They describe his childhood memories of Heidi herself and current thoughts of her, including of potentially contacting her by phone, as well as inviting her somewhere. Later, updated versions of the animated TV series contained the theme song in Afrikaans for the South African audience. At the time the original animated TV series was released in South Africa in 1978, "Heidi" had also been sung in English by artist Peter Lotis, and was released as a single. It attained the Number 2 position on the Springbok Charts on 16 June 1978, and remained on the charts for 13 weeks.

English versions
The entire series has been dubbed into English for broadcast in international English speaking markets. The dub possibly originates from Leephy Studios, the same studio which produced the English dub for Anne of Green Gables and the Afrikaans dub for this show.

Another English dub was made by Philippine-based Creative Products, the same company behind Filipino-English dubs that aired throughout Asia via Cartoon network. This dub was also broadcast on Cartoon Network India in 2001 and South Africa. The dub has never been released on home media and is very hard to find.

Despite this series' international popularity, the full series is less well known in the US and UK. The only version of this anime to have been commercially released in the United States and United Kingdom is a completely separate feature-length movie version of the TV series, created in 1975 according to the copyright, but supposedly not released until 1979. It was later released to home video in both continents in 1985 by Pacific Arts under the title The Story of Heidi. This version was produced by Claudio Guzman and Charles Ver Halen, with the English translation and dialogue by Dick Strome and featured a voice cast including Randi Kiger as Heidi, Billy Whitaker as Peter, Michelle Laurita as Clara, Vic Perrin as the Alm Uncle, the Doctor and Postman, Alan Reed (who died in 1977) as Sebastian and Mr. Usher, and legendary voice talent Janet Waldo as Aunt Dete. The version is distilled to only a small number of central episodes, as well as so two of the sub-plots (of the adopted Pichi and Meow, respectively) were part of the main plot instead, as well as cutting many other scenes of the episodes, either by shortening them or, most often, removing them entirely. The movie features excerpt of Takeo Watanabe soundtrack, but used in different sequences than the series. This dub also changes the name of the dog Josef to Bernard, ostensibly because he is a St. Bernard, as well as Pichi to Binky Bird. It aired on Nickelodeon's Special Delivery anthology series in the 1980s.

Tagalog version
The series was also dubbed in Tagalog in the Philippines on ABS-CBN in 1997.

Indian versions
In India, the English dubbed version of the series was broadcast on Cartoon Network in 2001.

Heidi was aired in Tamil, Telugu, Kannada and Malayalam languages in Chutti TV, Kushi TV, and Chintu TV and Kochu TV respectively.

Turkish versions
The series was broadcast in Turkey with Turkish dubbing. Originally broadcast on TRT, the series was later broadcast on CNBC-e, Kanal 1 and Kidz TV. The series, which was popular in the 1990s, is still widely watched and loved in Turkey.

Reception
Heidi, Girl of the Alps is still popular in Japan today — the love for Heidi has drawn thousands of Japanese tourists to the Swiss Alps. Stamps featuring Heidi have been issued by Japan Post. Japanese heavy metal rock band Animetal made a cover of the show's original theme song.  In the documentary about Studio Ghibli, The Kingdom of Dreams and Madness, Miyazaki refers to Heidi as Takahata's "masterpiece."

Episode list
 To the Mountain
 In Grandfather's House
 To the Pastures
 One More in the Family
 The Burnt Letter
 Whistle Louder
 The Fir's Whisper
 Where Has Pichi Gone?
 The Snowy Alps
 A Visit to Grandmother's House
 Snowstorm
 Sounds of Spring
 Return to the Meadows
 Sad News
 Snowflake
 Dorfli
 Unexpected Visitors
 The Departure
 On the Road to Frankfurt
 A New Life
 I Want to Fly
 Where Are the Mountains?
 The Great Commotion
 The Stray Cat
 The White Breads
 The Return of Herr Sesemann
 Another Grandmother
 A Tour to the Woods
 Two Hearts
 I Want to Catch the Sun
 Goodbye, Grandmamma
 A Rough Night
 Ghost Commotion
 To My Dear Mountains
 The Starry Sky of the Alps
 And To the Pastures
 Goat's Baby
 In a New House
 Don't Give Up, Peter!
 I Want To Go To the Alps
 The Doctor's Promise
 Reunion With Clara
 Clara's Wish
 A Little Plan
 Children of the Mountain
 Clara's Happiness
 Hello, Grandmother!
 A Small Hope
 A Promise
 Try to Stand
 Clara Walks
 Until We Meet Again

Music 
All the songs in the series are written by Eriko Kishida, composed by Takeo Watanabe and arranged by Yuji Matsuyama. The album with the songs was first published in Japan in May 1974 by Nippon Columbia (Catalog# KKS-4098).

Opening Theme:

"Tell me" (おしえて, Oshiete) sung by Kayoko Ishū with yodeling by Nelly Schwartz.

Ending Theme:

"Wait and See" (まっててごらん, Mattete Goran) sung by Kumiko Osugi, with yodeling by Nelly Scwhartz.

Insert songs:

 "Yuki and me" (ユキとわたし, Yuki to watashi) sung by Kumiko Osugi. Another rendition of the song is sung by Heidi's voice actress Kazuko Sugiyama.
 "Evening song" (夕方の歌, Yūgata no uta) sung by Kumiko Osugi.
 "Lullaby of the Alms" (アルムの子守唄, Arumu no komoriuta) sung by Nelly Schwartz. Another rendition of the song is sung by Kayoko Ishū.
 "Peter and me" (ペーターとわたし, Pētā to watashi) sung by Kumiko Osugi.

Movie
Episodes 4 and 45 of the series, were theatrically released in Japan in blow-up format during Tōhō Champion Matsuri, on March 21, 1974 and March, 12 1975 respectively.

A feature-length film was edited from the series by Zuiyo (which by then was a separate entity from Nippon Animation, which employed many of the TV series' animation staff) and released in Japanese theaters on March 17, 1979. All cast were replaced excluding Heidi and the grandfather. Isao Takahata remarked "Neither Hayao Miyazaki nor I are completely related to any shortening version" on this work.

Remake 
In 2015, an eponymous remake of the series has been produced by Belgian production house Studio 100. The series is an international co-production between various countries and consists of 39 episodes. A 26-episode second season featuring an entirely original plot was produced in 2019.

Parody 
A parody also produced by Zuiyo Arupusu no Shōjo Haiji? Chara Onji, has been broadcast by Fuji TV in the television show #Hi_Poul between 2016 and 2017. The series consists in 130 10-second shorts featuring Heidi's Grandfather.

See also
Heidi, the children's book on which this anime series was based.

References

External links
 

Heidi Art Exhibition in 2005 at the Ghibli Museum 

1974 anime television series debuts
1974 Japanese television series debuts
1974 Japanese television series endings
Animated television series about orphans
Drama anime and manga
Historical anime and manga
Heidi television series
Studio Ghibli
Television shows based on children's books
World Masterpiece Theater series
Television shows set in Frankfurt
Television shows set in Switzerland
ZDF original programming